Joan Catoni Conlon is Professor and Director of Graduate Choral Research Emerita for the University of Colorado at Boulder, where she conducted the University Singers. She received her BA, MA and DMA degrees from the University of Washington where she was Professor of Choral Music and Conducting (1972–95). From 1971 to 1995 she was the conductor of the Northwest Chamber Chorus in Seattle, Washington, and was the chair of the Research and Publications Committee of the American Choral Directors Association. Her scholarship specializes in the choral music of Georg Philipp Telemann and Claudio Monteverdi. She published Performing Monteverdi: A Conductor’s Guide. She has also studied the Hindustani classical vocal music of India. In 2009 she edited and contributed to  'Wisdom, Wit and Will: Women Choral Conductors On their Art' [.] -- a collection of essays relating to conducting choral literature and professional development.

Sources
 University of Colorado

References

Year of birth missing (living people)
Living people
University of Colorado faculty
University of Washington College of Arts and Sciences alumni
Place of birth missing (living people)